Sniderman is a surname. Notable people with the surname include:

 Harry Sniderman, Canadian sports figure
 Jason Sniderman, Canadian musician and businessman
 Lisa Sniderman, American musician and playwright
 Paul Sniderman (born 1941), American political scientist 
 Sam Sniderman (1920–2012), Canadian businessman